Lewis Baxter Schwellenbach (September 20, 1894 – June 10, 1948) was a United States senator from Washington, a United States district judge of the United States District Court for the Eastern District of Washington and the 5th United States Secretary of Labor.

Background

Born on September 20, 1894, in Superior, Douglas County, Wisconsin, Schwellenbach moved to Spokane, Washington with his parents in 1902, attending the Spokane elementary and high schools. He received a Bachelor of Laws in 1917 from the University of Washington School of Law. He was an assistant instructor at the University of Washington from 1916 to 1917.

Career

Schwellenbach entered service during World War I as a Private in the 12th Infantry Regiment of the United States Army in 1918 until his discharge as a Corporal in 1919. He was admitted to the bar and practiced in Seattle, Washington from 1919 to 1935. Schwellenbach served as state commander of the American Legion and president of the University of Washington's alumni association, and was a delegate to numerous county and state conventions. His prominence as a result of these leadership roles caused the Democratic Party to consider him for state offices including attorney general and governor. He was an unsuccessful candidate for nomination for Governor of Washington in 1932.

Congressional service

Schwellenbach was elected as a Democrat to the United States Senate and served from January 3, 1935, to December 16, 1940, when he resigned. He was not a candidate for renomination in 1940, having been appointed to the federal bench. He was a delegate to the Inter-Parliamentary Union at The Hague, Netherlands in 1938.

Federal judicial service

Schwellenbach was nominated by President Franklin D. Roosevelt on May 6, 1940, to a seat on the United States District Court for the Eastern District of Washington vacated by Judge J. Stanley Webster. He was confirmed by the United States Senate on May 6, 1940, and received his commission on November 20, 1940. His service terminated on June 30, 1945, due to his resignation to become Secretary of Labor.

Secretary of Labor

Schwellenbach was appointed United States Secretary of Labor by President Harry S. Truman and served from July 1, 1945, until his death in Walter Reed Army Medical Center in Washington, D.C. on June 10, 1948. He was interred in Washelli Cemetery in Seattle.

During Schwellenbach's tenure as Secretary, fear of post war unemployment brought the United States Congress to pass the Employment Act of 1946, which made promotion of maximum employment the Nation's top priority. Schwellenbach promoted abolition of war time wage and price controls. He had to deal with a post war wave of strikes. The Republican 80th United States Congress passed the Taft–Hartley Act. Staff cuts were made at the United States Department of Labor. The Conciliation Service was removed from the Department of Labor and established as the independent Federal Mediation and Conciliation Service (FMCS). During his term, the Department's international work was institutionalized; the Office of International Labor Affairs (now the Bureau of International Labor Affairs) was established as a unit in the Office of the Secretary.

Personal life and death
Schwellenbach's brother, Edgar W. Schwellenbach, served as a Justice of the Washington Supreme Court.

He married Anne Duffy in 1935 and they remained together until his death in 1948.

Schwellenbach died on June 10, 1948. He was buried at Washelli Cemetery in Seattle.

References

External links

 Time, October 15, 1945 (A likeness of Schwellenbach was on the cover)
 Truman, David McCullough 
 Department of Labor archives

1894 births
1948 deaths
Politicians from Spokane, Washington
United States Secretaries of Labor
Judges of the United States District Court for the Eastern District of Washington
United States district court judges appointed by Franklin D. Roosevelt
20th-century American judges
Politicians from Superior, Wisconsin
Democratic Party United States senators from Washington (state)
Washington (state) Democrats
Truman administration cabinet members
20th-century American politicians
University of Washington School of Law alumni
Lawyers from Spokane, Washington
United States Army personnel of World War I
United States Army non-commissioned officers